Club Café is a gay bar, restaurant and nightclub in Boston's Back Bay neighborhood, in the U.S. state of Massachusetts. The bar was established in 1983.

References

External links

 Club Café at Zagat

1983 establishments in Massachusetts
Back Bay, Boston
LGBT culture in Boston
LGBT nightclubs in Massachusetts